Sutherland is an unincorporated community in Dinwiddie County, Virginia, United States.

This town was a stop on the Southside Railroad in the mid-nineteenth century.   This became the Atlantic, Mississippi and Ohio Railroad in 1870 and then a line in the Norfolk and Western Railway and now the Norfolk Southern Railway.  Sutherland was the location of the American Civil War Battle of Sutherland's Station on April 2, 1865 during the Appomattox Campaign.

Mathematician Gladys West was born in Sutherland.

References

Unincorporated communities in Dinwiddie County, Virginia
Unincorporated communities in Virginia